CYP27C1   (cytochrome P450, family 27, subfamily C, polypeptide 1) is a protein that in humans is encoded by the CYP27C1 gene.

This gene encodes a member of the cytochrome P450 superfamily of enzymes. The cytochrome P450 proteins are monooxygenases which catalyze many reactions involved in drug metabolism and synthesis of cholesterol, steroids and other lipids.

The main function of the CYP27C1 enzyme is conversion of vitamin A1 (all-trans retinol) to vitamin A2 (all-trans 3,4-dehydroretinal).

Function 

CYP27C1 catalyzes 3,4-desaturation of retinoids, particularly all-trans-retinol (vitamin A1) to all-trans 3,4-dehydroretinal (vitamin A2). The enzyme is unusual among mammalian P450s in that the predominant oxidation is a desaturation and in that hydroxylation represents only a minor pathway - the enzyme catalyzes 3- and 4-hydroxylation as minor events. The enzyme is located in human skin epidermis. 

The function of the enzyme was only discovered in 2016. Before that, it was considered an "orphan" enzyme. An orphan enzyme is an enzyme activity that has been experimentally characterized but for which there is no known amino-acid or nucleotide sequence data.

Popular culture
CYP27C1 is the topic of the comic Sherman's lagoon for May 26, 2016.  In response to Hawthorne's inquiry about the chemical, Ernest explains that it is an enzyme that enhances ability to see infrared light, allowing fish to see better in murky waters.  Ernest can see however that Hawthorne is more interested in how to synthesize it commercially.

References

Further reading

External links